Okanagan South was a provincial electoral district in the Canadian province of British Columbia.  It first appeared in the general election of 1979 and last appeared in the 1986 general election.  The riding is similar to its main predecessor, South Okanagan, which last appeared in 1975.  The area of the riding was originally part of the Yale riding until 1890, then part of Yale-East from 1894 to 1900, then part of the electoral district of Okanagan from 1903 to 1912, and then South Okanagan until 1975.

The riding returned one member to the legislature in 1979 and 1983, and two members in 1986.

Notable MLAs

The most famous MLA from this riding was indubitably William Richards Bennett, Premier of BC 1975-1986.

Election results 

|-

|Progressive Conservative
|Ernest Garedner Arthur
|align="right"|1,479 		 	 	 		 	
|align="right"|4.49%
|align="right"|
|align="right"|unknown
|- bgcolor="white"
!align="right" colspan=3|Total valid votes
!align="right"|32,912 
!align="right"|100.00%
!align="right"|
|- bgcolor="white"
!align="right" colspan=3|Total rejected ballots
!align="right"|324
!align="right"|
!align="right"|
|- bgcolor="white"
!align="right" colspan=3|Turnout
!align="right"|%
!align="right"|
!align="right"|
|}   	  	
	

|-

|Liberal
|Robert N, McKee
|align="right"|848 	 	 	 	 	
|align="right"|2.03%
|align="right"|
|align="right"|unknown

|Independent
|Peter C.L. Griffiths
|align="right"|338 		 	 	 	 	
|align="right"|0.81%
|align="right"|
|align="right"|unknown

|Independent
|Frederick L. Bartell
|align="right"|165 	 	 	 	 	
|align="right"|0.39%
|align="right"|
|align="right"|unknown
|- bgcolor="white"
!align="right" colspan=3|Total valid votes
!align="right"|41,857	
!align="right"|100.00%
!align="right"|
|- bgcolor="white"
!align="right" colspan=3|Total rejected ballots
!align="right"|476
!align="right"|
!align="right"|
|- bgcolor="white"
!align="right" colspan=3|Turnout
!align="right"|%
!align="right"|
!align="right"|
|}   	  	
  	  	  	  	   	  	 

   	 
Redistribution of the riding following the 1986 election saw the seat broken into two, Okanagan West and Okanagan East.

External links

Elections BC website - historical election data

Former provincial electoral districts of British Columbia